Xia Shoutian (18701935) was a Chinese artist and politician active in both the Qing dynasty and the Republic of China.

References

1870 births
1935 deaths
20th-century Chinese artists
19th-century Chinese artists
Qing dynasty politicians from Hunan